Nasserredine Fillali (born January 18, 1984) is a boxer from Algeria.

He participated in the 2004 Summer Olympics for his native North African country. There he was stopped in the second round of the Light welterweight (64 kg) division by Bulgaria's eventual bronze medalist Boris Georgiev.

Fillali won the silver medal in the same division one year earlier, at the All-Africa Games in Abuja, Nigeria.

References

1984 births
Living people
Welterweight boxers
Boxers at the 2004 Summer Olympics
Olympic boxers of Algeria
Algerian male boxers
African Games silver medalists for Algeria
African Games medalists in boxing
Competitors at the 2003 All-Africa Games
21st-century Algerian people